The 1980 Northern Iowa Panthers football team represented the University of Northern Iowa as a member of the Association of Mid-Continent Universities during the 1980 NCAA Division II football season. Led by 21st-year head coach Stan Sheriff, the Panthers compiled an overall record of 7–4, with a mark of 2–2 in conference play, placing third in the Mid-Continent. Northern Iowa played home games at UNI-Dome in Cedar Falls, Iowa.

Schedule

References 

Northern Iowa
Northern Iowa Panthers football seasons
Northern Iowa Panthers football